The 1937 football season was São Paulo's 8th season since the club's founding in 1930.

Statistics

Scorers

Overall

{|class="wikitable"
|-
|Games played || 31 (9 Campeonato Paulista, 22 Friendly match)
|-
|Games won || 12 (4 Campeonato Paulista, 8 Friendly match)
|-
|Games drawn || 1 (0 Campeonato Paulista, 1 Friendly match)
|-
|Games lost || 18 (5 Campeonato Paulista, 13 Friendly match)
|-
|Goals scored || 51
|-
|Goals conceded || 51
|-
|Goal difference || 0
|-
|Best result || 7–0 (A) v Ypiranga-BA - Campeonato Paulista - 1937.11.18
|-
|Worst result || 1–4 (A) v Galícia - Friendly match - 1937.11.211–4 (A) v Santos - Campeonato Paulista - 1937.09.12
|-
|Most appearances || 
|-
|Top scorer || Milani (13)
|-

Friendlies

Official competitions

Campeonato Paulista

External links
official website 

Association football clubs 1937 season
1937
1937 in Brazilian football